Orpo may refer to:

the abbreviation of Ordnungspolizei
Petteri Orpo, Finnish politician